Charles E. Mason  (June 25, 1853 – October 21, 1936) was an American professional baseball player who played from 1875–1883, primarily as an outfielder.

Mason was considered a pioneer of baseball in Philadelphia. The Philadelphia Phillies and Philadelphia Athletics played an exhibition benefit game to honor Mason on April 10, 1928 at Shibe Park.

References

External links

Baseball players from Louisiana
Washington Nationals (NA) players
Philadelphia Centennials players
Philadelphia Athletics (AA) players
19th-century baseball players
1854 births
1936 deaths
Major League Baseball outfielders
Minor league baseball managers
Lynn Live Oaks players
Rochester (minor league baseball) players
Davenport Brown Stockings players
Philadelphia Athletics (minor league) players
Williams Ephs baseball players

 Charlie Mason at SABR (Baseball BioProject)